¡Tango! is a 1933 Argentine musical romance film, the first film to be made in Argentina using optical sound technology (but not the first sound film.)
Many existing stars of the Argentine stage and radio appeared in the film, but its success was limited due to poor sound quality and weak acting. ¡Tango! established a formula that would be used by many subsequent tango films.

Synopsis 
¡Tango! follows a formula established by Carlos Gardel with films such as Luces de Buenos Aires (The Lights of Buenos Aires, 1931) in which a melodramatic story is interspersed with tango songs.
However, the film had less dialog and more music, making it more like a musical revue.
This format would be copied by many subsequent films.

The plot is derived from tango songs.
Many of these songs tell of the seduction of an innocent slum girl by a rich man who promises her a glamorous life, but who abandons her when her looks fade.
The stylized and sentimental plot of ¡Tango!  revolves around a young man who is abandoned by his girlfriend for an older rich man and is heartbroken.
The film follows his misfortunes.
The final scene has the hero, dressed as a typical compadrito, singing Milonga del 900. The song, by Carlos Gardel, ends:

Cast 

 Libertad Lamarque as Elena
 Pepe Arias as Pepe el Bonito
 Tita Merello as Tita
 Alberto Gómez as Alberto
 Alicia Vignoli as Alicia
 Luis Sandrini as Berretín
 Meneca Tailhada as Mecha
 Juan Sarcione as Malandra
 Azucena Maizani as herself
 Mercedes Simone as herself
 Juan d'Arienzo
 Juan de Dios Filiberto
 Edgardo Donato
 Osvaldo Fresedo
 Pedro Maffia

Production 
The 80-minute black and white film was directed by Luis Moglia Barth, who co-wrote the script with Carlos de la Pua.
It was Argentina Sono Film's first production.
The film showed strong Hollywood influence in its cinematic techniques.
It was the first optical sound feature film to be produced in Argentina, at Argentina Sono Film's new optical sound studio.

The stars included the singer and actress Libertad Lamarque, the stage actor Pepe Arias, the singer Azucena Maizani and the comedian Tita Merello, all well-known theatre or tango performers.
The film featured the tango orchestras of Juan de Dios Filiberto, Osvaldo Fresedo and Pedro Maffia.
¡Tango! was released in Argentina on 27 April 1933.

Reception 
The approach of hiring well known performers ensured that devotees of popular theater and of radionovelas would form a ready audience for sound films.
Luis Sandrini, who played "the poor kid from the barrio, immature and insecure," became the first Argentine film star.
However, ¡Tango!  had poor sound quality, which made it less successful than it should have been given its star-studded cast.

References 
Notes

Citations

Sources

External links 

 

1933 films
1930s Spanish-language films
Films directed by Luis Moglia Barth
Argentine romantic musical films
1930s romantic musical films
Argentine black-and-white films